OJW can refer to:
 Outstanding judgment warrant - legal jargon for an unpaid ticket or citation
 ISO 639 language designation for the Saulteaux dialect of the Anishinaabe language, also known as Nakawēmowin